Hilary Jean Peacock  (born 8 February 1951) is a British sprint canoer who competed in the mid-1970s. She was eliminated in the semifinals of K-2 500 m event at the 1976 Summer Olympics in Montreal.  She was appointed MBE in the 1978 Birthday Honours.

References

1951 births
Canoeists at the 1976 Summer Olympics
Living people
Members of the Order of the British Empire
Olympic canoeists of Great Britain
British female canoeists